Khobi is a town in western Georgia with a population of 4,242. The settlement of Khobi acquired the status of a town in 1981 and currently functions as an administrative center of the Khobi District within the Samegrelo-Zemo Svaneti region.

See also
 Samegrelo-Zemo Svaneti

References 

Cities and towns in Samegrelo-Zemo Svaneti